Luanda, the Music Factory (original title: Luanda, a Fábrica da Música is a 2009 documentary film about Kuduro directed by Inês Gonçalves and Kiluanje Liberdade.

Synopsis
In the middle of a Luanda slum (musseque), DJ Buda owns a recording studio, giving the opportunity to young singers to express themselves. Rhyming at Buda's beats, kids shout out all their worries and everyday experiences to his old micro with an incredible energy. In the end they dance joyfully, laugh and listen to their own work with the inhabitants of the neighbourhood.

A new music and parties' market is exploding with the new generation.

Festivals
 DokFest, Germany (2010) 
 World Film Festival, Canada (2010)
 Festival de Cine Africano de Córdoba, Spain (2010)
 Play-Doc, Spain (2010) 
 Africa in the Picture, The Netherlands (2009)
 DocLisboa, Portugal (2009)
 DokLeipzig, Germany (2009)
 My World Images, Denmark
 Centre for African Culture, Norway

Bibliography
 Alisch, Stefanie; Siegert, Nadine, Angolanidade revisited – Kuduro, ACADEMIC, 6-June-2011, available in

External links

'AGORA LUANDA' Exhibition (in Portuguese)
Luanda, the Music Factory at RTP (Portugal)
Cinema Português
Luanda, the Music Factory at Público (Portugal)
Luanda, the Music Factory at Revista Visão' cinema blog.
Kuduro de Angola
in Diálogos antropológicos

References

Angolan documentary films
2009 documentary films
Documentary films about African music
Films set in Angola
Angolan music
Luanda
2000s Portuguese-language films
2009 films
Portuguese documentary films